The Wrocław Opera (Polish: Opera Wrocławska) is an opera company and opera house in the Old Town of Wrocław, Poland. The opera house was opened in 1841 and up to 1945 was named after the city's then German name, Oper Breslau.

History

An Italian opera company was established in Breslau in 1725 by Antonio Maria Peruzzi, following a split with Antonio Denzio with whom he had collaborated in the Peruzzi-Denzio company at the Sporck theatre in Prague. The Theater on the Cold Ashes was opened in 1755 by Franz von Schuch (1716–1764) and performed operas till his death in 1764. His son, Schuch the younger, brought the first operas of Johann Adam Hiller to the Theodor Lobe's theatre in Breslau in 1770. His successor Johann Christian Wäser introduced more, including local Singspiel translations of works by Pierre-Alexandre Monsigny. In 1804 Abbé Vogler invited Carl Maria von Weber to conduct the Breslau Opera when he was only 18. The opera house was constructed in 1841 to designs by Carl Gotthard Langhans, supervised by his son Carl Ferdinand. After the first fire, Theodor Lobe in 1867 invited the young conductor Ernst Schuch (1846–1914) to begin his career at the theatre.

After World War I notable productions during the interwar years included Schönberg's Die glückliche Hand (1928). The music directors in this period included Franz von Hoesslin who was forced to leave the city, and Germany, in 1928.

Polish period

Following the inclusion of Breslau into Poland in 1945, the Lower Silesian Opera made its inaugural performance in Polish Wrocław on September 8, 1945, with Stanisław Moniuszko's Halka directed by Stanislaw Drabik. From 1945 to 1950 the building housed not only the Opera, but also theater, puppet theater and operetta performances. In 1997 the current Director Ewa Michnik, undertook the idea to use other venues during the complete rehab of the building (1997–2006). She created a series of mega-productions that took place around the city including the Centennial Hall, The National Museum courtyard and banks of the Oder River. This tradition became a trademark of Wrocław Opera and continues to this day. The super productions are famous for interesting surroundings, attractive decorations and guest actors. The Opera also organized Wagner festivals building on the tradition of Wagner's involvement with Wrocław Opera. The current repertoire of the Opera House includes Kot w butach (Puss in Boots) by Bogdan Pawłowski and Matka czarnoskrzydłych snów by Hanna Kulenty.

In 2014, the opera house received 105,451 visitors.

In 2017, Leszek Możdżer's opera Immanuel Kant based on the works of Thomas Bernhard premiered at the Wrocław Opera.

Present-day administration
In September 2020, Halina Ołdakowska was appointed the director of the Wrocław Opera. Mariusz Kwiecień currently serves as the artistic director of the opera house while Bassem Akiki is the opera's music director.

Premieres
 Ludomir Różycki Eros und Psyche, 1914
 Leszek Możdżer Immanuel Kant, 2017

See also
Juliusz Słowacki Theatre
Lviv Opera

References

External links 

 Website of the Wrocław Opera 
 Opera – Stadttheater, Opernhaus na potalu polska-org.pl

Opera houses in Poland
Buildings and structures in Wrocław
Music venues completed in 1841
Organizations established in 1841
1945 establishments in Poland
Theatres completed in 1841
Arts organizations established in the 1840s
1841 establishments in Germany